Aakash Dahiya (born 20 September 1986) is a Mumbai-based actor and casting director, who is known for his work in Bollywood films.

Career 

Born in New Delhi, Dahiya started acting in the New Delhi Theater. He then started working as associate casting director with his friend Mukesh Chhabra in Mumbai.

His first role in Bollywood was as "Googly" in Chillar Party, directed by Nitesh Tiwari and Vikas Bahl. He also got some smaller roles in Rock Star (2011), Kaminey (2009) and Trishna (2011).

Later, in Nikhil Advani`s  D-Day, he acted as "Aslam". The film got critical appreciation and so did his character. After that, Dahiya appeared in  Mastram, and Bobby Jasoos. He conducted an acting workshop for the movie Bobby Jasoos.

He acted as Amit in Zeishan Quadri's Meeruthiya Gangster.
 In 2015 Aakash appeared in Anand L. Rai's Tanu Weds Manu Returns, in a short role as Deepak, but he got appreciation for his dazzling appearance.

Filmography

References

External links 
 
 

Living people
1983 births
Indian casting directors
Indian male film actors
Male actors in Hindi cinema
People from Delhi